Mount Bulla Bulla is a mountain in the of the Victorian Alps in the Great Dividing Range. It is located within the Alpine National Park, in the Australian state of Victoria. The name Bulla Bulla was the original indigenous name for Mt Buller.

The mountain has an elevation of  AMSL.

See also

Alpine National Park
List of mountains in Victoria
 Snowy River National Park

References

Mountains of Victoria (Australia)
Victorian Alps
Mountains of Hume (region)